Pine Island Glacier (PIG) is a large ice stream, and the fastest melting glacier in Antarctica, responsible for about 25% of Antarctica's ice loss. The glacier ice streams flow west-northwest along the south side of the Hudson Mountains into Pine Island Bay, Amundsen Sea, Antarctica. It was mapped by the United States Geological Survey (USGS) from surveys and United States Navy (USN) air photos, 1960–66, and named by the Advisory Committee on Antarctic Names (US-ACAN) in association with Pine Island Bay.

The area drained by Pine Island Glacier comprises about 10% of the West Antarctic Ice Sheet. Satellite measurements have shown that the Pine Island Glacier Basin has a greater net contribution of ice to the sea than any other ice drainage basin in the world and this has increased due to recent acceleration of the ice stream.

An iceberg about twice the size of Washington, DC broke off from the glacier in February 2020. Pine Island Glacier's ice velocity has accelerated to over 33 feet per day.

The area is not claimed by any nations and the Antarctic Treaty prohibits any new claims while it is in force.

Ice sheet drainage 

The ice sheet forms from snow which falls onto the continent and compacts under its own weight. The ice then moves under its own weight toward the edges of the continent. Most of this transport to the sea is by ice streams (faster moving channels of ice surrounded by slower moving ice walls) and outlet glaciers. The Antarctic ice sheet consists of the large, relatively stable, East Antarctic Ice Sheet and a smaller, less stable, West Antarctic Ice Sheet. The West Antarctic Ice Sheet is drained into the sea by several large ice streams, most of which flow into either  Ross Ice Shelf, or Filchner-Ronne Ice Shelf. Pine Island and Thwaites Glaciers are two major West Antarctic ice streams which do not flow into a large ice shelf. They are part of an area called the Amundsen Sea Embayment.

Weak underbelly of the West Antarctic Ice Sheet 

The Pine Island and Thwaites glaciers are two of Antarctica's five largest ice streams.

In 1981 Terry Hughes proposed that the region around Pine Island Bay may be a "weak underbelly" of the West Antarctic Ice Sheet. This is based on the fact that, unlike the majority of the large West Antarctic ice streams, those flowing into the Amundsen Sea are not protected from the ocean by large floating ice shelves. Also, although the surface of the glacier is above sea level, the base lies below sea level and slopes downward inland, this suggests that there is no geological barrier to stop a retreat of the ice once it has started.

Acceleration and thinning 

The Pine Island glacier began to retreat in the 1940s. Prior to this retreat, the grounding line of Pine Island Glacier was located on a prominent seabed ridge. This ridge now acts as a barrier, restricting the amount of relatively warm circumpolar deep water that can reach the thickest ice.

The speed of Pine Island Glacier increased by 77 percent from 1974 to the end of 2013, with half of this increase occurring between 2003 and 2009. In other words, much more water was being put into the sea by PIG than was being replaced by snowfall. It has also been shown that PIG underwent rapid thinning during the Holocene, and that this process may continue for centuries after it is initiated.

As the ice stream accelerates it is also getting steeper. The rate of thinning within the central trunk has quadrupled from 1995 to 2006. If the current rate of acceleration were to continue the main trunk of the glacier could be afloat within 100 years.

The ice front stayed in a more or less stable position from 1973 to 2014, with a 10 km retreat in 2015.

Subglacial volcano 

In January 2008, British Antarctic Survey (BAS) scientists reported that 2,200 years ago a volcano erupted under the Antarctic ice sheet. This was the biggest Antarctic eruption in the last 10,000 years. The volcano is situated in the Hudson Mountains, close to Pine Island Glacier. The eruption spread a layer of volcanic ash and tephra over the surface of the ice sheet. This ash was then buried under the snow and ice. The date of the eruption was estimated from the depth of burial of the ash. This method uses dates calculated from nearby ice cores. The presence of the volcano raises the possibility that volcanic activity could have contributed, or may contribute in the future, to increases in the flow of the glacier. In 2018 it was found that there is a substantial volcanic heat source beneath Pine Island Glacier approximately half as large as the active Grimsvötn volcano on Iceland. The same year a study was published concluding that the bedrock below WAIS was uplifted at a higher rate than previously thought, the authors suggested this could eventually help to stabilize the ice sheet.

History of fieldwork

On the ice 

Due to the remoteness of Pine Island Glacier, most of the information available on the ice stream comes from airborne or satellite-based measurements.

The first expedition to visit the ice stream was a United States over-snow traverse, which spent around a week in the area of PIG during January 1961. They dug snow pits to measure snow accumulation and carried out seismic surveys to measure ice thickness. One of the scientists on this traverse was Charles R. Bentley, who said "we didn't know we were crossing a glacier at the time." This expedition was called the "Ellsworth Highland Traverse".

In the 2004–2005 field season a team of nine, using a British Antarctic Survey (BAS) Twin Otter aircraft equipped with ice-penetrating radar, completed an aerial survey of PIG and its adjacent ice sheet. The team of seven British and two Americans flew 30 km grid patterns over the PIG until January 5, mapping the sub-glacial terrain of an area roughly the size of Nevada.

Due to the remoteness of PIG and the logistical difficulties of caching enough fuel for the 2004–05 expedition and future project(s), BAS used the resources of the United States Antarctic Program (USAP) and their ski-equipped LC130 aircraft. After many weeks of weather delays the first four men arrived from McMurdo Station on 9 November 2004, and began to establish camp and build a skiway for the C130s. The remaining members of the team arrived from Rothera Research Station 10 days later in a Twin Otter.

Because of unusually good weather in the area that season the survey completed flying their grids by mid-January, and began flying 15 km grids of Thwaites Glacier for a USAP expedition who had been experiencing unusually poor weather in their area that year.

Another team from the British Antarctic Survey arrived at the ice stream on 8 December 2006 for the first of two field seasons. In the second field season, they spent three months there from November 2007 to February 2008. Work on the glacier included radar measurements and seismic surveys.

It was decided that the small crevasse free area was too hard for further landings and so further fieldwork had to be postponed. Therefore, two Global Positioning System (GPS) units and a weather station were positioned as near as possible to PIG.

In the 2011–2012 field season, after five weeks of delays, the camp staff was finally able to establish the Main Camp just before New Year. The following week, Bindschadler and his team were able to arrive. Due to additional weather delays, the helicopters were not able to arrive by the NSF 'drop dead' date and the field season was cancelled. Limited science was still accomplished by the team thanks to a series of flights by KBA back onto the glacier; conditions had changed drastically since the last Twin Otter flights.

The British Antarctic Survey deployed a small team of four during the 2011–12 summer field season to carry out a series of seismic and radar surveys on PIG. They also installed a series of overwintering GPS stations. During the season, a separate BAS team travelled to the field party's location and installed an overwintering autonomous VLF station. This was followed by a radar traverse upstream using snowmobiles. This survey linked previous radar lines.

From the sea 

The first ship to reach Pine Island Glacier's ice shelf, in Pine Island Bay, was the USS/USCGC Glacier in 1985. This ship was an icebreaker operated by the U.S. Coast Guard. The mission, known as Deep Freeze, had scientists on board who took sediment samples from the ocean floor.

During the summer field season, over two months from January to February 2009, researchers aboard the U.S. Antarctic Program research vessel Nathaniel B. Palmer reached the ice shelf. This was the second time that the Palmer had successfully made it up to the glacier, the first time being in 1994. In collaboration with the British, the scientists used a robotic submarine to explore the glacier-carved channels on the continental shelf as well as the cavity below the ice shelf and glacier. The submarine, known as Autosub 3, was developed and built at the National Oceanography Centre in the UK. It completed six successful missions, travelling a total of  under the ice shelf. Autosub is able to map the base of the ice shelf as well as the ocean floor and take various measurements and samples of the water on the way. The success of Autosub 3 was particularly notable because its predecessor Autosub 2 was lost beneath the Fimbul Ice Shelf on only its second such mission.

See also 

 List of Antarctic ice streams
 List of glaciers in the Antarctic
 Sif Island

References

External links 

 Geo-temporal-spatial map of research publications on PIG and surrounding area
 NASA Earth Observatory: Images of Pine Island Glacier
 NASA Earth Observatory: Channel Beneath Pine Island Glacier
NASA image from October 2011 showing a large crack across the glacier

West Antarctica
Ice streams of Antarctica
Articles containing video clips